Date My Mom is a television dating show airing on the music channel MTV and produced by Kalissa Productions. The series premiered on November 15, 2004 and ended in 2006. An 18- to 24-year-old heterosexual male, gay male or lesbian female, goes on three separate dates with three moms, who try to convince them to pick their son or daughter to date. The dater only meets the mother and makes their decision solely on their impression of the mother and her descriptions of her child.

The dates are varied and are occasionally geared towards the dater's interests. The dates range from a simple lunch date to cheerleading lessons, washing cars, picking wild flowers, cooking, sports, and even getting tattoos. (It usually depends on the person's likes and dislikes). At the end of the date the mother reports back to the child. The mothers and contestants tend to be very assured of their chances.

After all dates are completed, an elaborate beachfront finale is conducted. The dater explains to each mother why they have or have not chosen her child, and one by one the sons or daughters are revealed according to the person's liking.

It has been alleged that the show is scripted.

Similar reality shows
 Date My Mom (UK)
 Meet My Folks
 Who Wants to Marry My Dad?
 Parental Control
 Nicht Ohne Meine Mutter (German version)
 Wanna Come In?
 Твою маму! (Ukrainian version)
 Gledaj majku biraj ćerku (Serbian version)

References

External links
 

2004 American television series debuts
2006 American television series endings
2000s American reality television series
American dating and relationship reality television series
English-language television shows
MTV game shows
2000s American game shows
Television series by Reveille Productions